The Dean of Moray was the head of the cathedral chapter of the diocese of Moray, north-central Scotland, based at Elgin Cathedral. The diocese of Moray is first known to have had a dean from a document dating between 1207 and 1208, and its first dean known by name from a document dating between 1207 and 1211. The position remained in existence until the 17th century.

List of deans of Moray
The following is a list of known deans of Moray:

Notes

References
 

Christianity in medieval Scotland
Religion in Highland (council area)
History of the Scottish Highlands
Religion in Moray
History of Moray
People associated with Highland (council area)
People associated with Moray
Scottish clergy